Deep Blue Sea is a 1999 American science fiction horror film directed by Renny Harlin and starring Saffron Burrows, Thomas Jane, Samuel L. Jackson, Michael Rapaport, and LL Cool J. Set in an isolated underwater facility, the film follows a team of scientists and their research on mako sharks to help fight Alzheimer's disease. The situation plunges into chaos when multiple genetically engineered sharks go on a rampage and flood the facility.

Deep Blue Sea had a production budget of $60–82 million and represented a test for Harlin, who had not made a commercially successful film since Cliffhanger in 1993. The film was primarily shot at Fox Baja Studios in Rosarito, Mexico, where the production team constructed sets above the large water tanks that had been built for James Cameron's 1997 film Titanic. Although Deep Blue Sea features some shots of real sharks, most of the sharks used in the film were either animatronic or computer generated. Trevor Rabin composed the film score; LL Cool J contributed two songs to the film: "Deepest Bluest (Shark's Fin)" and "Say What".

Released in theaters during the summer season, Deep Blue Sea grossed over $165 million worldwide. It received generally mixed reviews from critics, who praised its suspense, pacing, and action sequences, but criticized its unoriginality and B movie conventions. Retrospectively, Deep Blue Sea has been regarded as a successful shark film, especially within a limited genre that has been dominated by Steven Spielberg's 1975 thriller Jaws. A direct-to-video sequel, Deep Blue Sea 2, was released in 2018. A third film, Deep Blue Sea 3, was released on July 28, 2020.

Plot

In a remote underwater facility, doctors Susan McCallister and Jim Whitlock are conducting research on mako sharks to help in the re-activation of dormant human brain cells like those found in Alzheimer's disease patients. After one of the sharks escapes the facility and attempts to attack a boat full of young adults, financial backers send corporate executive Russell Franklin to investigate the facility.

Susan and Jim prove their research is working by testing a certain protein complex that was removed from the brain tissue of their largest shark, which bites off Jim's right arm upon awakening in the laboratory. Brenda Kerns, the tower's operator, calls a helicopter that braves heavy rain and strong winds to evacuate Jim. As Jim is being lifted the cable jams, dropping Jim and his stretcher into the shark pen. The largest shark grabs the stretcher and pulls the helicopter into the tower, killing Brenda and the pilots, as well as causing massive explosions that severely damage the facility.

In the laboratory, Susan, Franklin, wrangler Carter Blake, marine biologist Janice Higgins, and engineer Tom Scoggins witness the shark smash the stretcher against the laboratory's main window, which then shatters, drowning Jim and flooding the facility. The group goes to the facility's wet entry, where they plan to take a submersible to escape. Susan confesses to the others that she and Jim genetically engineered the sharks to increase their brain size, as they were not large enough to harvest sufficient amounts of the protein complex; this had the side effect of making them smarter and more deadly. When the group reaches the wet entry, they discover that the submersible has been damaged. While delivering a monologue emphasizing the need for group unity, Franklin is dragged into the submersible pool by one of the sharks and devoured.

The remaining crew opt to climb up the elevator shaft at the risk of destabilizing the pool. As they climb, explosive tremors cause the ladder to break, and Janice loses her grip and falls into the shark-infested water. Despite Carter's attempt to save her, one of the two remaining sharks drags Janice under, killing and devouring her. In the facility's kitchen, which has been partially flooded, cook Sherman "Preacher" Dudley, whose parrot is devoured in the process, manages to kill the first shark with an explosion. He then makes his way to the elevator shaft, where he encounters Carter, Scoggins, and Susan. Carter and Scoggins go to the flooded laboratory to activate a control panel that drains a stairway to the surface, while Susan heads to her room to collect her research material. Carter and Scoggins reach the control panel, but the largest shark storms in, killing and ripping Scoggins apart, and sabotaging the controls. In the other room, Susan encounters another shark, and electrocutes it with a power cable, destroying her research in the process.

After regrouping, Carter, Susan, and Preacher go to a decompression chamber and swim to the surface. Preacher is grabbed by the last shark, but is released when he stabs the shark in the eye with his crucifix, though he escapes with injuries to his leg. Carter realizes that the sharks made them flood the facility, so they could escape through the weaker mesh fences at the surface. In an effort to distract the shark from escaping to the open sea, Susan deliberately cuts her hand and dives into the water. Although she manages to distract the shark with her blood, she is unable to get out of the water, and is devoured, despite Carter's efforts to save her. While Carter is grabbing hold of the shark's dorsal fin, Preacher shoots the shark with a harpoon, but also pierces Carter's thigh. As the shark breaks through the fence, Carter orders Preacher to connect the trailing wire to a battery, sending an electric current through the wire and to an explosive charge in the harpoon, killing the shark. In the end, Carter reveals that he had managed to free himself in time, and joins Preacher to see a worker's boat en route on the horizon.

Cast
 Saffron Burrows as Dr. Susan McCallister
 Thomas Jane as Carter Blake
 LL Cool J as Sherman "Preacher" Dudley
 Jacqueline McKenzie as Janice "Jan" Higgins
 Michael Rapaport as Tom Scoggins
 Stellan Skarsgård as Dr. Jim Whitlock
 Aida Turturro as Brenda Kerns
 Samuel L. Jackson as Russell Franklin

Production

Development
The story of Deep Blue Sea was conceived by Australian screenwriter Duncan Kennedy after he witnessed the result of a "horrific" shark attack on a beach near his home. The tragedy contributed to a recurring nightmare of him "being in a passageway with sharks that could read his mind". This motivated him to write a spec script, while acknowledging the challenge of approaching a shark film without repeating Steven Spielberg's 1975 thriller Jaws. Although Warner Bros. bought the script in late 1994, actual development on the project did not start until two years later. When Renny Harlin was chosen to direct the film, Kennedy's screenplay, which had already been re-written by several writers at Warner Bros., was presented to Donna Powers and Wayne Powers, who turned it into the film's final script. According to Wayne, "The movie became essentially what we wrote. The draft we were first presented by [Warner Bros.] was much more of a military espionage, high-tech action movie, grenade launchers, that kind of thing. We wanted our team to include more blue-collar types and not to have weapons to fight back, to play it more as a horror film."

Deep Blue Sea had a budget of $82 million and represented a test for Harlin, who had not made a commercially successful film since Cliffhanger in 1993. Harlin's main goal was to bring the horror genre back to the serious and high-budget production values of films like The Exorcist, Jaws, The Shining, as opposed to the tongue-in-cheek style of subsequent films in the genre. Ridley Scott's 1979 film Alien was an influence on the casting process, as Harlin wanted to cast the characters in a way as to make it impossible for the audience to know who was going to die or survive. To achieve this, he combined relatively unknown actors who could deliver solid performances and meet the physical demands of the diving and stunts with a star, Academy Award nominee Samuel L. Jackson, who "anchors the whole piece". Harlin also forced the studio into hiring rapper LL Cool J because he wanted a character who could bring "a lot of warmth and humor to the film without it being joke-type humor".

Filming
Principal photography for Deep Blue Sea began on August 3, 1998. Most of the film was shot at Fox Baja Studios in Rosarito, Mexico, where the production team constructed sets above the large water tanks that had been built for James Cameron's 1997 film Titanic. Some of the sets were designed so that they could be submerged, while others were built on sound stages with fishtanks used as windows. At Fox Baja Studios, the cast worked with sharks that were either animatronic or computer generated. As the shark used in Jaws was 25 feet long, Harlin decided to increase their animatronic shark to 26 feet. Jackson recalled, "When they first brought it into the lab we were all in awe of the size of this machine [...] It was a real monster. I would walk up to it slowly and touch it and they said it felt like a real shark. The gills moved and it had a mind of its own sometimes." As an added homage to Jaws, the license plate pulled from the shark's teeth by Carter is the same plate found in the tiger shark carcass from Spielberg's film.

After the shoot at Fox Baja Studios wrapped, Harlin insisted the team go to The Bahamas to shoot with real sharks. Recounting his experience there, actor Thomas Jane, who played shark wrangler Carter, said, "The first day, I was in a cage, but the next day, they swam me 30 feet down... Then this guy yanks the breather off me and the water's churning with blood and guts and stuff... It was so terrifying that I don't want to remember it." The idea was to mix footage of real sharks with animatronic and computer generated sharks to ensure a seamless transition between them all. To distinguish Deep Blue Sea from Jaws, where the shark is frequently hidden, Harlin decided to show theirs more prominently because he felt that audience expectations had changed since then.

The scene where the cast is trying to get back to the elevator after hooking up actor Stellan Skarsgård to the helicopter is actually an accident that made it into the finished film. As Jackson explained, "At one point three tons of water got thrown on us by accident and we got swept toward those cargo bays and everyone thought we were going into the drink and people were tumbling around this metal grating [...] We scrambled up and kept acting [...] That was not supposed to happen and we didn't have safety harnesses on and we were flailing around on this deck." Jackson was initially offered the role played by LL Cool J, but his management team did not like the idea of him playing a chef, so Harlin created the role of Russell Franklin for him. Additionally, LL Cool J's character was supposed to die early on, but the director ultimately decided to keep him. The production team could not afford to have a fully trained parrot for LL Cool J's character, so they used two parrots: one that was good at flying, and another that could sit on his shoulder.

The film's ending was changed shortly before its theatrical release. Originally, Burrows's character would escape the shark infested water and live. However, the test audience, who saw the film less than a month before its release, disapproved of the ending because she was behind the shark experiments and was seen as the film's villain. As a result, the production team did a one-day reshoot in the Universal Studios tank and did some computer generated work on the sharks to change it. In 2009, Harlin explained that Deep Blue Sea was the hardest film he had ever made because most of the shooting days involved the team standing in water or being under water for long periods. According to him, "Just the practicality of putting a wet suit on in the morning, being in the water all day. Your script, all your paperwork has to be made of plastic paper. And things that you wouldn't think would ever float, they float. [...] Or then things that you hope would float actually sink and you can't find them anywhere."

Music
The film score for Deep Blue Sea was composed by Trevor Rabin. Rabin's music ranges from orchestral and choral arrangements to electronic soundscapes, and was noted for its use of both dramatic and easily accessible themes. The soundtrack features two songs by LL Cool J"Deepest Bluest (Shark's Fin)" and "Say What"which were used in the end credits. Two soundtrack albums were also released for the film. The first album, Deep Blue Sea: Music from the Motion Picture, was released on August 3, 1999 by Warner Bros. Records and features a set of hip hop and R&B tracks by several artists, including Hi-C, Cormega, and Bass Odyssey. The second album, Deep Blue Sea: Original Motion Picture Score, was released on August 24, 1999 by Varèse Sarabande and contains musical tracks by Rabin.

Release

Box office
Deep Blue Sea performed well when it opened on July 30, 1999 in 2,854 theaters, finishing third and grossing around $18.6 million at the US weekend box office. During its second weekend, the film grossed an estimated $11 million and finished in fifth place, behind The Sixth Sense, The Blair Witch Project, Runaway Bride, and The Thomas Crown Affair. Deep Blue Sea grossed over $73.7 million the United States and Canada and $91.4 million internationally, grossing over $165 million worldwide. The film's performance was compared to Stephen Sommers's The Mummy and Jan de Bont's The Haunting, which had a similar budget and made a significant impact on the box office in the summer of 1999.

Critical response
Deep Blue Sea received mixed reviews from critics. Review aggregator Rotten Tomatoes gives the film a "Fresh" 60% rating, based on 114 reviews. The critics consensus reads, "Deep Blue Sea is no Jaws, but action fans seeking some toothy action can certainly do - and almost certainly have done - far worse for B-movie thrills." On Metacritic, the film has a score of 54 out of 100, based on reviews from 22 critics, indicating "mixed or average reviews". Audiences polled by CinemaScore gave the film an average grade of "B" on an A+ to F scale. Writing for Chicago Sun-Times, Roger Ebert gave the film three out of four stars and praised it as "a skillful thriller", saying that Deep Blue Sea "is essentially one well-done action sequence after another [...] It doesn't linger on the special effects (some of the sharks look like cartoons), but it knows how to use timing, suspense, quick movement and [especially] surprise". He concluded that the film keeps spectators guessing in an otherwise predictable genre.

In a positive review, Kenneth Turan of Los Angeles Times considered Deep Blue Sea a return to form for Harlin, especially after the "dismal swamps" of Cutthroat Island and The Long Kiss Goodnight. He described the film as "an example of how expert action filmmaking and up-to-the-minute visual effects can transcend a workmanlike script and bring excitement to conventional genre material". Similarly, Desson Howe of The Washington Post remarked that, while the film's premise feels familiar, it "knows its audience and knows what'll get them going – and even wondering". He said that Deep Blue Sea might not be Harlin's finest two hours, but he managed to build "something that, if nothing else, gives you a great big shock every few minutes". In a three-and-a-half out of four review, Robert Lasowski of The Florida Times-Union highly praised the film's pacing, intense action, and chase scenes, stating that Deep Blue Sea is "a great popcorn movie" and "what summer at the cineplex is all about".

Other reviews were less enthusiastic. Writing for The New York Times, Stephen Holden described Deep Blue Sea as "a cut-rate Titanic stripped of romance and historical resonance and fused with Jaws, shorn of mythic symbolism and without complex characters", while Barbara Shulgasser of Chicago Tribune criticized it for being an inferior imitation of Jurassic Park, but praised LL Cool J's performance and the film's realistic setting. Ian Nathan of the British magazine Empire gave the film three out of five stars and criticized its B movie conventions, stating that "You're never entirely sure whether you're laughing at or with Deep Blue Sea." Variety reviewer Robert Koehler felt the computer generated sharks were inconsistently realized, but nevertheless highlighted the flooding of the facility very positively. The dialogue between action sequences was also praised, especially LL Cool J's "blend of Bible talk, smack and wit". Despite his few lines, Jane was seen as a charismatic character and "a genuine new action star".

Home media
Deep Blue Sea was first released on DVD on December 7, 1999, courtesy of Warner Home Video. Special features include the film in a 2.35:1 anamorphic format, two behind-the-scene featurettes, five deleted scenes with extended dialogue and relationships between the characters, and an audio commentary in which Harlin and Jackson discuss the film's technical features and special effects. Warner also released the film on Blu-ray on October 12, 2010, which includes the same special features from the DVD release.

Legacy
In a 2016 retrospective, Wired editor Brian Raftery considered Deep Blue Sea "the greatest non-Jaws shark movie of all time" and superior to Jaume Collet-Serra's The Shallows. He remarked that, within a genre that had been dominated by Jaws, Deep Blue Sea features "genuinely inventive" action sequences, "nicely rounded-out, human" characters, and memorable death scenes. Raftery also noted that the film was among the last of its kind, describing it as "[A]n R-rated B-movie, full of gore and chaos and smart-stupidness, but with a big-budget, big-cast sheen", in a similar way to Paul Verhoeven's Total Recall and Starship Troopers, Roland Emmerich's Stargate, and Luc Besson's The Fifth Element. Samuel L. Jackson's surprising death scene in the film appears on some lists of best film deaths of all time.

Deep Blue Sea has often been cited as one of the greatest shark films of all time. In 2012, PopMatters ranked the film third, behind Jaws and Open Water, and described it as "[O]ne of the last great [films] from action ace Renny Harlin." In 2015, Den of Geek!, a publication of Dennis Publishing, ranked Deep Blue Sea only behind Jaws and credited it for its action-packed scenes and intelligent sharks. In 2017, Slant Magazine ranked it seventh and highlighted Jackson's death scene and LL Cool J's performance, while Complex ranked it third, praising its talented actors and tight action sequences. In 2019, to celebrate the 20th anniversary of the release of Deep Blue Sea, the Screamfest Horror Film Festival hosted a screening at the TCL Chinese theaters in Hollywood, California, as part of its "Fears & Beers" program. Cast members including actor Thomas Jane attended for a post-screening Q&A moderated by Brian Collins of Birth.Movies.Death.

Sequels 
A direct-to-video sequel, Deep Blue Sea 2, was released in 2018. A third film, Deep Blue Sea 3, was released on July 28, 2020.

References

External links

 

1999 films
1999 horror films
1990s disaster films
1990s horror thriller films
1990s science fiction horror films
American disaster films
American natural horror films
American science fiction horror films
1990s English-language films
Films about genetic engineering
Films scored by Trevor Rabin
Films directed by Renny Harlin
Films produced by Akiva Goldsman
Films shot in Mexico
Films shot in San Diego
Films about shark attacks
Sea adventure films
Underwater action films
Village Roadshow Pictures films
Warner Bros. films
Deep Blue Sea (film series)
1990s American films